The Servicemembers Civil Relief Act (formerly called the Soldiers' and Sailors' Civil Relief Act) (codified at 50 U.S.C. §§ 3901—4043) is a United States federal law that protects soldiers, sailors, airmen, marines, coast guardsmen, and commissioned officers in the Public Health Service and National Oceanic and Atmospheric Administration from being sued while in active military service of their country and for up to a year after active duty, as well as U.S. citizens serving with allied military forces for the duration of a military conflict involving the United States.

History
Despite the act's official title dating it to 1940, its origins can be traced as far back as the Civil War when the United States Congress passed a total moratorium on civil actions brought against Union soldiers and sailors. In basic terms, this meant that any legal action involving a civil matter was put on hold until after the soldier or sailor returned from the war. Examples of civil matters included breach of contract, bankruptcy, foreclosure, or divorce proceedings.

Congress' intent in passing the moratorium was to protect both national interests and those of servicemembers. First, Congress wanted servicemembers to be able to fight the war without having to worry about problems that might arise at home. Secondly, because most soldiers and sailors during the Civil War were not well paid, it was difficult for them to honor their pre-service debts, such as mortgage payments or other credit.

Congressional concern about protecting the rights of servicemembers was raised again during World War I when the Soldiers' and Sailors' Civil Relief Act of 1918 was passed. Like the Civil War-era moratorium, the 1918 legislation was designed to protect the rights of service members while they were serving in the war. Although the 1918 Act did not include a total moratorium on civil actions, it did protect service members from such things as repossession of property, bankruptcy, foreclosure or other such actions while they were in harm's way. The 1918 Act stayed in effect until shortly after World War I, when it expired.

The present-day statute, essentially a reenactment of the 1918 law, was passed in 1940 to protect the rights of the millions of service members activated for World War II. The major difference between it and the 1918 version, other than minor modifications, was there was no provision for the act to expire, as it did after World War I. Thus, since 1940, service members have received uninterrupted coverage under the act. And indeed, congressional commitment and support for the act has remained so strong, the act has been amended more than 12 times since 1940 to keep pace with a changing military and a changing world, with the last amendments added, in 2003, through the Servicemembers Civil Relief Act.

Provisions

Courts will generally require litigants to provide proof that an individual is not on active duty before adverse action is taken, i.e. foreclosures, garnishments, attachments, evictions, and judgments. It is important to note that the benefits conferred upon servicemembers extend after active duty.  Verification of active military duty may be achieved on-line via the Defense Manpower Data Center.

The act also specifically states that servicemembers and their spouses do not gain or lose a domicile based on their presence or lack thereof in any U.S. jurisdiction solely on the basis of military orders. Section 571 outlines this concept for purposes of taxation, and Section 595 for voting purposes.

See also 
 Military Spouses Residency Relief Act

References

Sources

United States Department of Justice
United States Department of Defense

External links

Service Members Civil Relief Act (SCRA) Federal Verification Service

United States military law
United States federal defense and national security legislation
United States federal judiciary legislation
1940 in American law
76th United States Congress
United States federal legislation articles without infoboxes